Warren Grove is an unincorporated rural community that is a part of Stafford Township, Barnegat Township and Little Egg Harbor Township in Ocean County, New Jersey, United States. Its location in the heart of the Pine Barrens makes it one of the most secluded and remote corners of the state.

The Warren Grove Gunnery Range is a military bomb practice range. Military planes, including A-10s and F-16s from East Coast Air National Guard units, use the area for practice bombing and strafing. Warren Grove is also home to the Pygmy Pine Plains, populated by dwarf pitch pine and blackjack oaks.

Incidents
In May 2007, flares dropped from an F-16 belonging to the 177th Fighter Wing set off a large wildfire that consumed more than 18,000 acres (73 km) of the Pinelands and forced the evacuation of hundreds of residents.
In November 2004, an F-16 fired 25 rounds that hit the Little Egg Harbor Intermediate School.
In January 2002, an aircraft practicing at Warren Grove crashed near the Garden State Parkway spewing flames and molten metal across the busy road.
In June 2001, a  forest fire occurred when an Air National Guard plane dropped a 25-pound practice bomb at the range.

References

Stafford Township, New Jersey
Barnegat Township, New Jersey
Little Egg Harbor Township, New Jersey
Populated places in the Pine Barrens (New Jersey)
Unincorporated communities in Ocean County, New Jersey
Unincorporated communities in New Jersey